Naval Reactors (NR), also known as the Naval Nuclear Propulsion Program, is an umbrella term for the U.S. government office that has comprehensive responsibility for the safe and reliable operation of the United States Navy's nuclear propulsion program. A single entity, it has authority and reporting responsibilities within both the United States Department of the Navy (Office of the Chief of Naval Operations, OPNAV, and the Naval Sea Systems Command, NAVSEA) and the United States Department of Energy in its National Nuclear Security Administration.

Naval Reactors is headed by the director of the Naval Nuclear Propulsion Program, who is a Navy four-star admiral. The director serves for a nominal eight-year term of office, the longest standard assignment in the U.S. military.  The program was originally created under Executive Order 12344, by the president of the United States on February 1, 1982. The director was concurrently assigned as the deputy administrator for Naval Reactors for the National Nuclear Security Administration via   on October 19, 1984 in order to assist them in the research, design, development, health, and safety matters pertaining to naval nuclear propulsion plants via . Executive Order 12344 was made a permanent federal program via  of October 5, 1999.

History
Soon after his U.S. Navy service during World War II, Captain (later Admiral) Hyman G. Rickover became an early advocate of nuclear marine propulsion. Assigned to the Bureau of Ships in September 1947, Rickover received training in nuclear power at Oak Ridge, Tennessee, and worked with the Bureau to explore the possibility of nuclear ship propulsion. In February 1949 he received an assignment to the Division of Reactor Development, United States Atomic Energy Commission and then assumed control of the Navy's effort as Director of the Naval Reactors Branch in the Bureau of Ships.

The office was originally a joint activity of the U.S. Atomic Energy Commission (AEC) and the U.S. Navy's Bureau of Ships. When the AEC was abolished, Naval Reactors became a joint effort of the Navy and the Energy Research and Development Administration, which partly replaced the AEC. In 1977, ERDA was combined with the Federal Energy Administration to form the U.S. Department of Energy. On the Navy side of the organization, the Bureau of Ships has transitioned since the 1950s to become the Naval Sea Systems Command (NAVSEA), within which NR is Code 08, usually abbreviated NAVSEA 08 or SEA 08.

Within seven years of its inception, the organization that developed from this concept would put into operation the nation's first power reactor (the S1W reactor). The following four years would see three more nuclear submarines and two reactor plant prototypes operating and another seven ships and two prototypes being built. To date, more reactors have been built and safely operated by the NR program than any other US program.

Admiral Rickover parlayed an impressive personal publicity effort and intensive links with the United States Congress into an unprecedented tenure as head of Naval Reactors whereby he could not be relieved by conventional military procedures. He was promoted, partially as a result of Congressional involvement, until he reached the rank of full Admiral and held the position for over 30 years from 1949 to February 1, 1982 (when he was retired).

The history of nuclear propulsion and Rickover's influence and involvement is substantial. Due to the importance and impact of nuclear power, the AEC commissioned the creation of two related historical records to capture important facts of both naval nuclear propulsion and the Shippingport commercial reactor.  Both of these official documents necessarily contain a good deal of information on Rickover's choices, methods and technical philosophy in the development of practical nuclear power, but are not biographies.  While Rickover cooperated to provide real-time access to facilities, people and records, according to the authors he did not edit; Rickover was in-fact deceased before the second document was completed. These are: (1) Nuclear Navy, 1946-1962 by AEC staff historians Richard G. Hewlett and Francis Duncan, and (2) Rickover and the Nuclear Navy: The Discipline of Technology by Francis Duncan. The AEC makes both of these documents directly available to the public in digital form.

Management and personnel principles
Many books (including those referenced below) and articles have been written about core NR management principles such as attention to detail and adherence to rigidly-defined standards and specifications, as well as the organization's unique (for government) personnel practices. NR staff and alumni (including Admiral Rickover himself) have often been called by Congress, the President and other government agencies to provide expert opinion and management support to other important government programs, most notably the large scale reviews following the destruction of the Space Shuttles Columbia and Challenger.

Program elements
Research, development, and support laboratories
Nuclear Component Procurement Organization
Nuclear power schools and Naval Reactors training facilities.
Naval Nuclear Propulsion Program Headquarters and field offices
Naval support facilities and tenders
Shipyards that build, overhaul and service the propulsion plants of naval nuclear-powered vessels

List of directors 

The Director of Naval Reactors also concurrently serves as a Deputy Administrator of the National Nuclear Security Administration.

Notes

References
 The Rickover Effect: How One Man Made a Difference, Theodore Rockwell, Naval Institute Press (Annapolis, MD), 1992
 Nuclear Navy: 1946-1962, Francis Duncan and Richard G. Hewlett, Naval Institute Press (Annapolis, MD), 1974
 Rickover and the Nuclear Navy: The Discipline of Technology, Francis Duncan, Naval Institute Press (Annapolis, MD), 1990
  Against the Tide: Rickover's Leadership Principles and the Rise of the Nuclear Navy, Dave Oliver, Naval Institute Press (Annapolis, MD), 2014
  Naval Reactors History Database

Nuclear propulsion
Naval reactors
United States Navy organization
United States Department of Energy